Tomcat: Dangerous Desires is a direct-to-video 1993 erotic thriller film directed by Paul Donovan and starring Richard Grieco and Maryam D'Abo.

Synopsis
Tom (Grieco), who suffers from a rare DNA degenerative condition, becomes the subject of a secretive, inter-species experiment. To treat his disease, his doctor (D'Abo) decides to inject him a part of feline brain. While the feline injections have restored his health, Tom slowly transforms as a result.

Cast
Richard Grieco as Tom
Natalie Radford as Imogen
Maryam d'Abo as Jacki
Serge Houde as Dr Pace

Production
Republic Pictures Productions – Domestic Theatrical Distributor
Saban Entertainment – Foreign Distribution Sales
Republic Pictures Home Video – Domestic Video Distributor

Review

—Cavett Binion, The New York Times

References

External links
 
 
 Tomcat: Dangerous Desires Synopsis

1993 direct-to-video films
1993 films
American psychological thriller films
American direct-to-video films
English-language Canadian films
1990s psychological thriller films
Direct-to-video erotic thriller films
Films about genetic engineering
Films directed by Paul Donovan
Canadian psychological thriller films
Canadian direct-to-video films
1990s English-language films
1990s American films
1990s Canadian films